Hollow is a 2011 British found footage horror film, directed by Michael Axelgaard, starring Emily Plumtree, Sam Stockman, Jessica Ellerby, and Matt Stokoe. The film was distributed by Tribeca Film via nationwide On Demand outlets. Hollow premiered at Fantasia Festival. The film also screened at the Raindance Film Festival and was nominated for British Independent Film Award.

Plot
The film tells the story of an "old monastery in a small, remote village in Suffolk, England that has been haunted by a local legend for centuries. Left in ruin and shrouded by the mystery of a dark spirit that wills young couples to suicide, the place has been avoided for years, marked only by a twisted, ancient tree with an ominous hollow said to be the home of great evil. When four friends on holiday explore the local folklore, they realise that belief in a myth can quickly materialise into reality, bringing horror to life for the town."

Cast
 Emily Plumtree as Emma
 Sam Stockman as James
 Jessica Ellerby as Lynne
Matt Stokoe as Scott

Reception

Nigel Floyd from Time Out London gave the film 1/5 stars, writing "Director Michael Axelgaard and scriptwriter Matthew Holt spend time establishing the characters’ emotional histories and current vulnerabilities, balancing the external, supernatural threat with the fraught dynamics of the group. But they completely fail to stretch this credibility-defying, stop-start plot into a full-length ‘found footage’ feature." Kim Newman from Empire Magazine Awarded it 2/5 stars, calling it "A so-so spookfest that offers few surprises". Matt Glasby  from Total Film also gave it 2/5 stars, stating that "proceedings switch from quietly creepy to loudly exasperating as relationship woes replace scares". Thomas Spurlin from DVD Talk gave the film anegative review, writing, Hollow becomes a tepid stretch of jostled camera footage and yelling, chronicling the tedious psychosis that ensues when these characters finally start caring about the ancient curse when their lives are threatened."

References

External links
 
 
 
 Hollow at Tribeca

2011 films
2011 horror films
British horror films
Found footage films
2010s English-language films
2010s British films